Lasius balearicus is an ant species from the genus Lasius. It was discovered in 1982 by Cedric Alex Collingwood, an entomologist from the Royal Entomological Society and described as a new species in 2014 after a team from the Institut de Biologia Evolutiva in Barcelona collected the holotype in 2008. L. balearicus is confined to the island of Majorca and it is the first known endemic ant species from the Balearic Islands and the first known endemic Lasius species from any Mediterranean island.

The total length of a L. balearicus worker is about 4 mm. The body is distinctive yellowish-brown.

L. balearicus is restricted to Serra de Tramuntana, a mountain range on Majorca where it is occurred in altitudes from 800 to 1400 m. On the basis of DNA analysis it was determined that it diverged from its nearest relatives 1,51 million years ago and formed an isolated population.

Talavera, Espadaler & Vila (2014), who described Lasius balearicus, recommended listing the species as endangered (EN) in the IUCN Red List due to climate change.

References

Insects described in 2014
Fauna of Mallorca
Endemic fauna of the Balearic Islands
Hymenoptera of Europe
balearicus